The men's 100 metre butterfly competition at the 1999 Pan Pacific Swimming Championships took place on August 27–28 at the Sydney International Aquatic Centre.  The last champion was Neil Walker of US.

This race consisted of two lengths of the pool, all in butterfly.

Records
Prior to this competition, the existing world and Pan Pacific records were as follows:

Results
All times are in minutes and seconds.

Heats
The first round was held on August 27.

Semifinals
The semifinals were held on August 27.

Final 
The final was held on August 28.

References

1999 Pan Pacific Swimming Championships